Malcolm Knox (born 1966), is an Australian journalist and author.

Life and literary career
Malcolm Knox grew up in Sydney and studied in Sydney and Scotland. He has held a number of positions at the Sydney Morning Herald including chief cricket correspondent (1996–99), assistant sport editor (1999–2000) and literary editor (2002–06). 
As literary editor, he broke the story of the fake Jordanian memoirist, Norma Khouri, which won him a Walkley Award (Investigative Journalism category) in 2004 (together with Caroline Overington). He has written nineteen books including five novels.

Malcolm has served as a Board Director of the Copyright Agency (2008-2016) and a Board Director of the Chappell Foundation (2017-2021), acting as honorary secretary from 2019-2021. He is currently a Board Director for the Australian Society of Authors.

Between 1989 and 1993 he didn’t watch any movies or listen to any music.

Bibliography

Novels
 
 A Private Man (2004) (released in the UK as Adult Book (2005))
 Jamaica (2007) 
 The Life (2011)
 The Wonder Lover (2015)
Bluebird (2020)

Non-fiction
 Taylor And Beyond (2000)
 I Still Call Australia Home: The Qantas Story 1920–2005  (2005)
 1788 Words or Less: A short short history of Australia (2005)
 Secrets of the Jury Room (2006)
 Scattered: The Inside Story of Ice in Australia (2008)
 On Obsession (2008)
 The Greatest: The players, the moments, the matches 1993–2008 (2009)
 The Captains: The story behind Australia's second most important job (2010)
 Fierce Focus: Greg Chappell (2011)
 Bradman's War: How the 1948 invincibles turned the cricket pitch into a battlefield (2012)
 Never a Gentlemen's Game (2012)
 Boom: The Underground History of Australia, from Goldrush to GFC (2013)
 
 Supermarket Monsters: The Price of Coles' and Woolworths' Dominance (2015)
 The Keepers: The players at the heart of Australian cricket (2015)
 Phillip Hughes: The Official Biography (co-authored with Peter Lalor) (2015)

Critical studies and reviews of Knox's work
The life

Awards and nominations
 Named one of the Sydney Morning Herald's Best Young Australian novelists (2001)
A Private Man, was shortlisted for the Commonwealth Book Prize and the Tasmanian Premier's Award.
 Walkley Award (Investigative Journalism category) in 2004 (together with Caroline Overington) for the exposé of fraudulent author Norma Khouri (author of Forbidden Love).
 He was runner up for Graham Perkin Australian Journalist of the Year Award 2004.
 Winner of a Ned Kelly Award (2005) Best First Fiction for A Private Man
 Secrets of the Jury Room won an Alex Buzo prize for research
 Walkley Award (2007) for Magazine Feature Writing for essay 'Cruising: Life and Death on the High Seas' was published in the September 2006 issue of The Monthly.
 Winner of the Colin Roderick Award (2008) for Jamaica (best book published in Australia in the preceding year dealing with an aspect of Australian life)
 Winner of the Ashurst Business Literature Prize (2014) for Boom

References

External links
 Malcolm Knox at Allen & Unwin
 Malcolm Knox at Random House

1966 births
Living people
20th-century Australian novelists
21st-century Australian novelists
Australian journalists
Australian male novelists
The Monthly people
Ned Kelly Award winners
Writers from New South Wales
Cricket historians and writers
20th-century Australian male writers
21st-century Australian male writers
The Sydney Morning Herald people